Fours is a commune in the Nièvre department in central France.

Geography
The river Alène forms all of the commune's northern border.

Demographics
On 1 January 2019, the estimated population was 642.

See also
Communes of the Nièvre department

References

Communes of Nièvre